Rineloricaria formosa is a species of catfish in the family Loricariidae. It is native to South America, where it occurs in the western Orinoco and upper Amazon River basins in Brazil, Colombia, and Venezuela. The species reaches 15.2 cm (6 inches) in standard length and is believed to be a facultative air-breather.

References 

Loricariini
Fish described in 1979
Catfish of South America
Fish of Brazil
Fish of Colombia
Fish of Venezuela
Fish of the Amazon basin